Pedioplanis bengulensis, known commonly as the Angolan sand lizard or Bocage's sand lizard, is a species of lizard in the family Lacertidae. The species is endemic to Southern Africa.

Geographic range
P. benguelensis is found in Angola and Namibia.

Reproduction
P. benguelensis is oviparous.

References

Further reading
Bocage JVB (1867). "Diagnoses de quelques reptiles nouveaux de l'Afrique occidentale". Jornal de sciencias mathematicas physicas e naturaes, Academia Real das Sciencias de Lisboa 1 (3): 229-232. ("Eremias benguelensis [sic]", new species, p. 229). (in French).
Branch, Bill (2004). Field Guide to Snakes and other Reptiles of Southern Africa. Third Revised edition, Second impression. Sanibel Island, Florida: Ralph Curtis Books. 399 pp. . (Pedioplanis benguellensis, p. 173).

Pedioplanis
Lacertid lizards of Africa
Reptiles of Angola
Reptiles of Namibia
Reptiles described in 1867
Taxa named by José Vicente Barbosa du Bocage